Shalishuka Maurya was the 6th Emperor of the Indian Maurya dynasty. He ruled from 215–202 BCE. He was the successor and son of Samprati Maurya. While the Yuga Purana section of the Gargi Samhita mentions him as a quarrelsome, unrighteous ruler, he is also noted as being of "righteous words" 

According to the Puranas he was succeeded by Devavarman.

Notes

Mauryan emperors
3rd-century BC Indian monarchs
3rd-century BC births
210s BC deaths